Greg Roskowski was an announcer of  Radio Ceylon during the height of the station's popularity in the 1950s in the Indian Subcontinent. Roskowski, born of a Japanese mother and a Polish father, was the booming voice of Radio Ceylon's morning radio programs.

The Roskowski family at one time also owned and ran Hotel Nippon, a middle-budget hotel and restaurant, situated in the commercial heart of Colombo. Hotel Nippon has one of the earliest oriental restaurants and it exists to this day, in downtown Colombo.

According to one-time radio colleague Jimmy Bharucha, Greg Roskowski used to receive fan mail of over 500 letters a day. Listeners to Radio Ceylon enjoyed his 'wakey wakey' style and he introduced the hit songs of Frank Sinatra, Dean Martin, Sammy Davis Junior, Bill Haley & His Comets, Cliff Richard and Elvis Presley to audiences in Ceylon and beyond.

Greg Roskowski was known as 'Happy-go-lucky-Greg' over the airwaves of Radio Ceylon. He was immensely popular on the Commercial Service of Radio Ceylon and the All Asia Service where he presented a countdown of English pop music called the Binanca Hit Parade.

Indian listeners of Greg Roskowski's programme then wrote into the station in the thousands clamouring for a countdown programme of Hindi filmi songs since All India Radio had banned Bollywood music. Binaca Geetmala, presented by Ameen Sayani, was the outcome – it became an iconic radio programme over the airwaves of Radio Ceylon.

Greg Roskowski was one of a handful of 'overseas announcers' working for Radio Ceylon in the 1950s and 1960s when the station ruled the airwaves in the Indian Subcontinent; the others being the American Craig Thompson who co-presented the Kiddies Corner, a program for children and Ameen Syani from India, who presented Binaca Geet Mala, a program of Indian filmi music.

See also
Radio Ceylon
Sri Lanka Broadcasting Corporation
List of Sri Lankan broadcasters
Kiddies Corner

References

Bibliography
 Wavell, Stuart. - The Art of Radio - Training Manual written by the Director Training of the CBC. - Ceylon Broadcasting Corporation, 1969.

External links
 SLBC-creating new waves of history
Eighty Years of Broadcasting in Sri Lanka
Sri Lanka Broadcasting Corporation

Sri Lankan radio personalities
Sri Lankan people of Japanese descent
Sri Lankan people of Polish descent